Fort Lewis was a United States Army post from 1917 to 2010 located  south-southwest of Tacoma, Washington. Fort Lewis was merged with McChord Air Force Base on 1 February 2010 to form Joint Base Lewis–McChord.

It is the premier military installation in the northwest and is the most requested duty station in the army.

Joint Base Lewis-McChord is a major Army base, with much of the 2nd Infantry Division in residence, along with Headquarters, 7th Infantry Division; 593rd Expeditionary Sustainment Command; and 1st Special Forces Group. However, the Headquarters of the 7th Infantry Division is primarily a garrison management body. Fort Lewis's geographic location provides rapid access to the deep water ports of Tacoma, Olympia and Seattle for deploying equipment. Units can be deployed from McChord Field, and individuals and small groups can also use nearby Sea-Tac Airport. The strategic location of the base provides Air Force units with the ability to conduct combat and humanitarian airlift with the C-17 Globemaster III.

Joint Base Garrison

The Joint Base Garrison operates the installation on behalf of the warfighting units, families and extended military community who depend on JBLM for support. The mission of the unit is to provide support to mission commanders and the joint base community, to serve as an enabler to the soldiers as they train and project America's combat power, and to make JBLM the station of choice for American soldiers and their families.

With an Army joint base commander and an Air Force deputy joint base commander, the garrison supports the installation through directorates and agencies that provide a full range of city services and quality-of-life functions; everything from facilities maintenance, recreation and family programs to training support and emergency services.

The major organizations that make up the bulk of the Joint Base Garrison include:
 Directorates of Public Works: Logistics
 Family and Morale, Welfare and Recreation
 Human Resources; Emergency Services
 Plans and Training Security and Plans

Additional staff offices that support the installation mission include the Joint Base Public Affairs Office, the Religious Support Office, the Resource Management Office, Equal Employment Opportunity Office, the Installation Safety Office, and the Plans, Analysis and Integration Office. Other partners who work closely with the Joint Base Garrison include the Civilian Personnel Advisory Center, the Mission, and Installation Contracting Command, and Joint Personal Property Shipping Office.

Three military units support the Joint Base Garrison
 627th Air Base Group
 Provides command and control and administrative oversight to the Airmen who perform installation support duties on behalf of the garrison.
 Headquarters and Headquarters Company, Joint Base Garrison
 Provides administrative oversight to the Army personnel in the garrison and supports newly arrived soldiers during their in-processing period.

JBLM Soldiers receive medical care through on-base Madigan Healthcare System facilities such as Madigan Army Medical Center, the Okubo Clinic, and the Nisqually Clinic. JBLM Airmen receive medical care at the McChord Clinic as well as Madigan Army Medical Center.

JBLM Main and JBLM North
JBLM has more than 25,000 soldiers and civilian workers. The post supports over 120,000 military retirees and more than 29,000 family members living both on and off post.

JBLM Main & North have abundant high-quality, close-in training areas, including 115 live fire ranges. Additional training space is available at the Yakima Training Center in eastern Washington, including maneuver areas and additional live fire ranges.

In 2009, the former Fort Lewis Regional Correction Facility was remodeled and renamed the Northwest Joint Regional Correctional Facility (NWJRCF). The facility houses minimum and medium security prisoners from all branches of the U.S. Armed Forces.

Also adjacent to the post is Camp Murray (Washington National Guard).

History

Fort Lewis was originally established in 1917 with the passage of a Pierce County bond measure to purchase  of land to donate to the federal government for permanent use as a military installation. A portion of the initial land was taken from the Nisqually tribe's reservation. (The Nisqually people would later petition unsuccessfully for the return of this land.) In 1927, Pierce County passed another bond measure to establish a military airfield just north of Fort Lewis. The airfield, called Tacoma Field, opened in 1930 and was renamed McChord Field in 1940. McChord Field separated from Fort Lewis when the U.S. Air Force was created in 1947 and was subsequently renamed McChord Air Force Base. The two bases operated independently of one another for more than 60 years before merging in 2010.

They donated the land to the federal government for military use. The only stipulation was that the tract be used as a permanent army post. Captain David L. Stone and his staff arrived at the camp site 26 May 1917, and a few days later the initial construction began. As work on the camp was pushing forward, the War Department named it "Camp Lewis" after Meriwether Lewis of the Lewis and Clark Expedition. The entire camp was ready for occupancy a month ahead of schedule. In 90 days, Stone had supervised the construction of a "city" of 757 buildings and 422 other structures, all lighted and heated for 60,000 men. The first recruits moved into their new barracks on 5 September 1917, exactly two months after the post building plan had been handed to the contractors.

When they implemented auction of the new cantonment, workmen subscribed $4,000 to build the main gate – which is still standing. The arch was built of fieldstone and squared logs resembling the old blockhouses which stood in the northwest as forts. Some 60,000 men, including the 13th and 91st Divisions, moved into the hastily constructed cantonment to train for World War I. Recruited largely from the northwest, the 91st was considered "Washington's Own." In 1917, Pierce County, through the process of condemnation proceedings (eminent domain), took  of the Nisqually Indian Reservation (14 km2) for the Fort Lewis Military Reserve.

The following two years saw tremendous activity at Camp Lewis as men mobilized and trained for war service. With the conclusion of the war, activities at Lewis ground to a standstill. Camp Lewis passed from the hands of Pierce County and became the property of the federal government when the deed for 62,432 acres (253 km2) was recorded in the county auditor's office in Tacoma.

When World War I ended in 1918, the Nisqually people petitioned for their land to be returned to them, but the request was denied by the Secretary of War, Newton Baker.

Brigadier General David L. Stone, who had supervised the original construction of Fort Lewis as a captain, returned as its commanding general in 1936, serving until 1937. The project of constructing an army airfield, which later became McChord Air Force Base, directly north of the Fort Lewis installation, received approval as a WPA project in January 1938, and $61,730 was allocated for construction.

From 1942 to 1943, forty-two Japanese, German and Italian Americans were held at Fort Lewis as part of the government's "enemy alien" internment program during World War II. The Japanese and Italian internees were transferred to Fort Missoula and the Germans to Fort Lincoln, and the temporary detention facility closed on 30 March 1943. Italian prisoners of war, organized into units, were trained as quartermaster units at Fort Lewis, since after Italy surrendered to the Allies and declared war on Germany, they were not strictly held to the work requirements that prohibited prisoners of war from working on items directly headed for the war or in the war effort.

At the conclusion of World War II, the northwest staging area of Fort Lewis became a separation center and discharged its first soldiers in October 1945. Sometime in the early 1960s Interstate 5 was built through the fort separating the northwest corner of the fort, and creating "Northfort". With the departure of the 4th Infantry Division (United States) for Vietnam in 1966, Fort Lewis once again became a personnel transfer and training center. David H. Hackworth described his service commanding a training battalion at the Fort during the Vietnam War in his memoir "About Face". In 1972, the 9th Infantry Division (United States) was reactivated, and trained there until its deactivation in 1991.

The Fort Lewis Military Museum was established in 1972 to preserve and document the post's history.

The base received much media attention in the wake of the Kandahar massacre, committed by a Fort Lewis soldier in March 2012.

The 1st Joint Mobilization Brigade disbanded in late May 2014. It previously controlled and provided host unit support to mobilizing, deploying and demobilizing reserve component units from all the U.S. military services. The unit began as the 2122st Garrison Support Unit (Army Reserve), overseeing the mobilization of about 27,000 Soldiers. The group of fewer than a dozen personnel mobilized about 15,000 soldiers within three weeks at the start of the War in Afghanistan. The unit was redesignated the 654th Area Support Group (Forward) in May 2004, and the 1st JMB in March 2007. Training and mobilization validation moved to individual units (instead of the 1st JMB) in 2011.

Major units

The United States Army's I Corps commands most Army units at Joint Base Lewis-McChord, and conducts planning and liaison with other assigned active and Reserve component units in the continental United States. It is one of the active Army's contingency corps. I Corps stays prepared to deploy on short notice worldwide to command up to five divisions or a joint task force.

In 1981, I Corps was reactivated at Fort Lewis. On 12 October 1999, General Eric K. Shinseki, Chief of Staff of the Army, announced I Corps would lead the acceleration of Army transformation, training and the initial creation of the first two Stryker Brigade Combat Teams at Fort Lewis. Since 11 September 2001, I Corps and Fort Lewis assets have been active in providing support for Global War on Terrorism operations, including Operation Noble Eagle (Homeland Defense), Operation Enduring Freedom (Afghanistan) and the Iraq War.

On 5 February 2004, Task Force Olympia was activated, as a sub-element of I Corps headquarters with the mission to command forward-deployed units in Iraq. This marked the first time that I Corps had forward soldiers in combat since the end of the Korean War. Task Force Olympia included units from all three components of the Army (Active, Reserve and National Guard) as well as Marine and Australian officers. Task Force Olympia's subordinate units included the 3rd Stryker Brigade Combat Team, 2nd Infantry Division, which deployed for Iraq on 8 November 2003, and returned to Fort Lewis after one year of combat duty, and the 1st Brigade, 25th Infantry Division, which departed Fort Lewis on 15 September 2004, for one year and returned September 2005. On 1 June 2006, the 1st Brigade, 25th Infantry Division cased its colors and became the 2d Cavalry Regiment – Stryker Brigade Combat Team with its home station in Germany. A new unit then uncased the colors of its new designation on 1 June 2006 – the 4th Brigade, 2d Infantry Division.

Subordinate units assigned to Fort Lewis are:

7th Infantry Division
 1st Brigade, 2nd Infantry Division
 2nd Brigade, 2nd Infantry Division
 17th Field Artillery Brigade
 16th Combat Aviation Brigade
 201st Expeditionary Military Intelligence Brigade
 555th Engineer Brigade
 593rd Expeditionary Sustainment Command
 42nd Military Police Brigade
 62nd Medical Brigade
 Henry H. Lind Noncommissioned Officer Academy
 1st Special Forces Group (Airborne)

 2nd Battalion, 75th Ranger Regiment
 66th Theater Aviation Command
 4th Battalion, 160th Special Operations Aviation Regiment (Airborne)
 404th Army Field Support Brigade
 Eighth Brigade, U.S. Army Cadet Command (ROTC)
 189th Infantry Brigade (First Army, DIVWEST)
 191st Infantry Brigade (inactivation ceremony held on 8 January 2014)
 Headquarters, 6th Military Police Group (CID)
 Washington Regional Flight Center
 Western Regional Medical Command
 Public Health Command Region-West
 The KIM Dental Activity
 The Veterinary Treatment Facility

JBLM Main and JBLM North
JBLM has more than 25,000 soldiers and civilian workers. The post supports over 120,000 military retirees and more than 29,000 family members living both on and off post. Fort Lewis proper contains 86,000 acres (350 km2); the Yakima Training Center covers 324,000 acres (1,310 km2).

JBLM Main & North have abundant high-quality, close-in training areas, including 115 live fire ranges. Additional training space is available at the Yakima Training Center in eastern Washington, including maneuver areas and additional live fire ranges.

In 2009, the former Fort Lewis Regional Correction Facility was remodeled and renamed the Northwest Joint Regional Correctional Facility (NWJRCF). The facility houses minimum and medium security prisoners from all branches of the U.S. Armed Forces.

During the summer months (June, July, August), JBLM North hosts the Leader Development and Assessment Course, a capstone program for the U.S. Army's ROTC program.

Also adjacent to the post is Camp Murray (Washington National Guard).

Yakima Training Center

The Yakima Training Center is a major sub-installation of JBLM, and provides a full range of training lands and ranges to active and reserve component units.

The training center is high desert, and is covered with sagebrush, volcanic formations, dry gulches and large rock outcroppings. YTC has vast flat valleys separated by intervening ridges which are suited to large-scale mechanized or motorized forces. Much of the steeper terrain resembles areas of Afghanistan. Twenty-five ranges, including the state-of-the-art Multi-Purpose Range Complex and Shoot House, are available for individual or collective training.

Prior to 1941, the area consisted of ranches and a few scattered silica mines. Just before World War II, the Army's need for a large training and maneuver area became apparent, and the Army negotiated with landowners to lease  for the Yakima Anti-Aircraft Artillery Range. Military organizations in the Pacific Northwest used the center for range firing and small unit tests.

During 1949 and 1950, the state of Washington used the center for summer training of its National Guard units and regular Army troops were permanently assigned to the center. At the start of the Korean War, the Army decided to expand Yakima Training Center.

The Multi-Purpose Range Complex opened in 1989, and the Shoot House and Urban Assault Course opened in 2005. YTC has an AAFES shopette, a recreation center and a gymnasium available to soldiers and their families. The Firing Point community club, with cafeteria, opened in February 2009.

Gray Army Airfield 

Gray Army Airfield , is a military airport located within Fort Lewis. The field is named in honor of Captain Lawrence C. Gray, who died during a free balloon flight at the field on 4 November 1927. The field is now used by Army helicopters.

Helicopters based at the airfield assisted with medical evacuations at Mount Rainier National Park on numerous occasions in the 1970s. Army helicopters were also used to insert search-and-rescue [SAR] teams into inaccessible areas on the east, north, and west sides of the mountain, lowering rangers to the ground by a cable device known as a "jungle penetrator". Helicopters began assisting with high altitude (above 10,000 feet) SAR operations in the 1980s. Helicopters were also used for "short haul" rescue operations, in which a ranger and litter were carried in a sling below the helicopter to the scene of the accident.

During World War II the Air Transport Command 4131st Army Air Force Base Unit used GAAF as the CONUS hub for the Alaskan West Coast Wing, ferrying supplies, equipment and aircraft to Eleventh Air Force at Elmendorf Field, near Anchorage. Also used by Air Technical Service Command as an aircraft maintenance and supply depot; primarily to service aircraft being sent to Alaska. The Army Air Force closed its facilities in 1947.

Geography
According to the United States Census Bureau, the CDP has a total area of 15.9 square miles (41.2 km2), of which, 15.3 square miles (39.6 km2) of it is land and 0.6 square miles (1.6 km2) of it is water. The total area is 3.78% water. The military base is, as previously stated, much larger than the CDP defined by the Census Bureau.

Fort Lewis' terrain is primarily a mixture of dense conifer woods and open Puget prairie-garry oak woodlands. Invasive Scotch Broom has taken over many areas. The landscape is very rocky from glacial meltwater deposits. Poison oak is found in the training areas. Canada Thistle grows thickly in some areas. All trees are to be left standing; post policy prohibits cutting or trimming them.

Although July and August are the driest months.

Fort Lewis, due to its size and reserved land, serves as an important habitat for amphibian development and study.

Demographics
The census-designated place (CDP) Fort Lewis is located within the installation's area. As of the 2000 census, the CDP, which includes the most densely populated part of the base, had a total population of 19,089.

As of the census of 2000, there were 19,089 people, 3,476 households, and 3,399 families residing on the base. The population density was 1,248.5 people per square mile (482.0/km2). There were 3,560 housing units at an average density of 232.8 per square mile (89.9/km2). The racial makeup of the base was 60.4% White, 20.3% African American, 1.4% Native American, 3.4% Asian, 1.8% Pacific Islander, 6.2% from other races, and 6.4% from two or more races. 13.1% of the population were Hispanic or Latino of any race.

There were 3,476 households, out of which 85.8% had children under the age of 18 living with them, 89.3% were married couples living together, 6.6% had a female householder with no husband present, and 2.2% were non-families. Of all households 2.0% were made up of individuals, and 0.0% had someone living alone who was 65 years of age or older. The average household size was 3.75 and the average family size was 3.78.

The age distribution was 32.1% under the age of 18, 28.0% from 18 to 24, 37.5% from 25 to 44, 2.0% from 45 to 64, and 0.4% who were 65 years of age or older. The median age was 22 years. For every 100 females, there were 168.3 males. For every 100 females age 18 and over, there were 212.5 males. All these statistics were typical for military bases.

The median income for a household on the base was $32,384, and the median income for a family was $32,251. Males had a median income of $20,878 versus $20,086 for females. The per capita income for the base was $12,865. 8.2% of the population and 7.1% of families were below the poverty line. Out of the total population, 10.7% of those under the age of 18 and 0.0% of those 65 and older were living below the poverty line.

See also
 91st Division Monument

References

Further reading
 Alan Archambault. Fort Lewis, Arcadia Publishing, 2002. .

External links

Official Joint Base Lewis-McChord homepage
Army history at Joint Base Lewis-McChord
JBLM Morale, Welfare and Recreation
United States Army Environmental Command
3rd Brigade / 2nd Infantry Division homepage
5th Brigade / 2nd Infantry Division homepage
42nd Military Police Brigade homepage
BRAC 2005: Closings, Realignments to Reshape Infrastructure
Historic American Buildings Survey (HABS) documentation, filed under DuPont, Pierce County, WA:

Installations of the United States Army in Washington (state)
Lewis
Buildings and structures in Pierce County, Washington
Buildings and structures in Thurston County, Washington
Census-designated places in Washington (state)
Historic American Buildings Survey in Washington (state)
Populated places in Pierce County, Washington
Populated places in Thurston County, Washington
Military installations established in 1917
Populated places established in 1917
1917 establishments in Washington (state)
Military Superfund sites
Superfund sites in Washington (state)
Joint Base Lewis–McChord